The 2003 Porsche Carrera Cup Deutschland season was the 18th German Porsche Carrera Cup season. It began on 26 April at Hockenheim and finished on 4 October at the same circuit, after nine rounds. It ran as a support championship for the 2003 DTM season. Frank Stippler won the championship by 10 points.

Teams and drivers

Race calendar and results

External links
The Porsche Carrera Cup Germany website
Porsche Carrera Cup Germany Online Magazine

Porsche Carrera Cup Germany seasons
Porsche Carrera Cup Germany